The May Conspiracy was an unsuccessful attempt of radical democrats in the Czech lands to overthrow the government of Austrian Empire in May 1849.

History
In 1844 a group of Czech Radical Democrats which included both Czechs and Czech Germans formed a secret political club called "Repeal". This was named after the mass Irish movement to repeal the Act of Union from 1800. Among the leaders were Josef Václav Frič, Karel Sabina, Karel Sladkovský, Emanuel Arnold and Vilém Gauč. The club attracted radical students and local intelligentsia and remained active after revolutions of 1848 were suppressed.

In March 1849, Mikhail Bakunin, a Russian Pan Slavic revolutionary, visited Prague and suggested to organize an armed uprising in Prague and several German-speaking cities as a response to post-1848 political reaction. The date of the uprising was set for 12 May 1849 but, owing to amateurish organization, police took the organizers into custody on the night of 9-10 May 1849.

Prague and a few towns were put under a state of emergency (also called "the siege", stav obležení), press was put under censorship by the military and a military commission was established to investigate the conspiracy. The emergency was only lifted 4½ years later, on 1 September 1853. Seventy-nine young radicals were sentenced to prison, and most of them were released in general amnesty on 8 May 1857. Others fled to Britain, but had to devote their efforts to survival with little ability to further the revolution as exiles.

See also 
Revolutions of 1848 in the Austrian Empire
Forty-Eighters emigrees after 1848
 May Coup (Serbia) in 1903

References

History of Austria-Hungary
19th-century revolutions
1849 in the Austrian Empire
1849 in politics
19th century in Prague
Politics of the Austrian Empire